Lillestrøm Station is a railway station serving the town of Lillestrøm in Skedsmo, Norway. Located on the Gardermoen Line and the Trunk Line as well as being the western terminus of the Kongsvinger Line, it is the main transport hub of the eastern parts of the Greater Oslo area, and all trains east of Oslo – local, regional, airport express, and long-distance express – call at Lillestrøm.

History
The station was built as part of the Trunk Line, Norway's first railway, and opened in 1854. When the new Gardermoen Line from Oslo via Oslo Airport, Gardermoen to Eidsvoll opened in 1998 the station was completely renovated and became the only stop for the Airport Express Train east of Oslo.

Lines and services

References

External links 
Jernbaneverket's entry on Lillestrøm Station
Norwegian State Railsways' (NSB) entry on Lillestrøm Station
Lillestrøm Station, Entry on Flytoget

1854 establishments in Norway
Flytoget
Lillestrøm
Railway stations in Skedsmo
Railway stations on the Gardermoen Line
Railway stations on the Kongsvinger Line
Railway stations on the Trunk Line
Railway stations opened in 1854